Parwaaz Hai Junoon (lit: Soaring is Passion) is a 2018 Pakistani aerial combat-war romantic film, directed by Haseeb Hassan, produced by Momina Duraid and written by Farhat Ishtiaq. The film features an ensemble cast of Hamza Ali Abbasi, Ahad Raza Mir, Hania Amir, Kubra Khan, Alamdar Khan, Marina Khan, Shamoon Abbasi, Adnan Jaffar, Shaz Khan, Shafaat Ali, and Mustafa Changazi in pivotal roles. Earlier, Osman Khalid Butt was also a part of the film but had to withdraw as the film's shoot schedule clashed with his promotions for Balu Mahi. The film is a tribute to Pakistan Air Force.

It was released on Eid al-Adha, 24 August 2018, under Momina & Duraid Films and was distributed by Hum Films. It is the seventh-highest-grossing Pakistani film of all time.

Plot

The film shifts back and forth between two narratives. First a young woman Sania (Hania Amir) is sitting by the mountainsides of outer Islamabad in Pakistan. While enjoying several cups of tea, she looks up at the sky and stares in awe of a PAF (Pakistan Air Force) jet flying overby. In the next scene 3 enemy Mirage-2000's "from the Eastern sector" have infiltrated Pakistani airspace and 2 PAF JF-17's, piloted by Hamza Haider Ali (Hamza Ali Abbasi) and Nadir Kirmani (Shaz Khan) are scrambled to intercept them. After an intense aerial dogfight, Hamza shoots down one Mirage-2000 with a missile and tries to shoot down the second one with guns which end up jamming. Instead of following orders to retreat from the scene, he stays in the confrontation despite his weapons not functioning and provides cover for his wingman and best friend Nadir to shoot down the second jet with a missile. The third intruder retreats from the battle and Hamza and Nadir return home victorious. Hamza is however reprimanded by his commanding officer for taking such a dangerous risk during the battle with malfunctioning weapons but Hamza mentions how we was mirroring Squadron Leader Sarfaraz Ahmed Rafique's similar circumstances during the 1965 India-Pakistan war which led to his martyrdom.

A group of young hopefuls who all want to become PAF Fighter Pilots are then shown travelling towards the PAF academy. These hopefuls include the bold but arrogant Saad Khan (Ahad Raza Mir), shy and hardworking Rashid Minhas Yousufzai (Sikander Vincent Khan Yousafzai), goofy Zaid Ali (Shafaat Ali), Shamir Hamid and female cadets Sania and Ujala. Sania is questioned by the selection committee (who are very hesitant to select her because of her barely meeting the physical height requirements despite her superior academics) as to why she wants to become a PAF fighter pilot despite having grown up in the United States since the age of 10 and having a foreign passport and education. She replies with the fact of her undying love for her home country and wanting to serve in the armed forces. All the candidates are then approved and selected for the GD fighter pilot training selection program. The new PAF trainees then undergo a tough physical and mental training routine by their superiors, often with hilarious outcomes. Over the course of the training Saad makes fun of Sania and the other female cadets and ridicules the fact of females trying to become fighter pilots, much to Sania's annoyance.

The film then shifts to Hamza preparing Nadir for his wedding to Fiza, who happens to be Sania's cousin. At the wedding Hamza meets Sania for the first time and is instantly smitten by her. He tries to court her and after some playful back and forth they soon start seeing each other and fall in love. Going on motorcycle trips and having several cups of tea by the mountainside becomes a regular activity for them. Hamza explains to Sania how he loves being a fighter pilot for Pakistan just like his dad was and Sania teases him to whether he would choose her or continue being a fighter pilot if he had to make a choice between the two. He gets hurt and offended even though she was only joking as he explains how he holds both things dear. She accepts this fact and becomes fully supportive of his career. After a rise in terrorist attacks by Taliban militants in the urban areas of Pakistan, the Pakistani Forces resolve to fight and rid the country of these militants once and for all, and Hamza and Nadir are chosen to fly on several bombing missions against them. Fiza who is now pregnant is worried for Nadir's safety, who reassures her that he will be fine. Sania is also worried for Hamza who reassures her that he will either return successful or as a "shaheed" (martyr) in which case he will live forever in the spiritual sense. When Sania's mother finds out about her relationship with Hamza, she is angered and forbids her to marry him on the grounds that Sania's father was a pilot as well who had died in a plane crash when Sania was a child and left Sania's mother as a young widow. She doesn't want Sania to go through the same thing and is very dismissive of Hamza when she meets him. However Hamza impresses Sania's mother with his patriotism and loyalty to making the citizens of Pakistan safe and his genuine love for Sania, after which she blesses their union. Hamza and Nadir then lead a formation of F-16's and carry out a successful strike against several senior Taliban militant leaders, some of whom were directly involved with the APS school massacre. Hamza takes out their compound with bombs while Nadir takes out a convoy using AGM's (Air to Ground Missiles).

Back at the PAF academy, Saad performs well in flight training, but his weaknesses are exposed as a group leader when he is made leader of the cadets during a training expedition on the snowy slopes of Pakistan. Sania and Rashid then excel him in all other training courses and exercises after which he gets increasingly jealous of them both, especially after the other cadets make fun of him and when he starts to see Sania becoming good friends with Rashid. Zaid fails his flying course and decides to no longer continue. He then decides to leave the Airforce. When he nearly goes out off the door his friends, Saad and Rashid cry and then Zaid also becomes emotional. The scene then jumps to Sania coming close to failing as she has trouble with close formation flying. She gets very depressed, stating that she will be crushed if she does not become a fighter pilot. Even though Saad still continues to makes fun of her and the female cadets for joining the PAF, he affectionately gives her advice and tips on how to do well in close formation flying. Sania then passes and is elated but becomes even more elated when she learns that Rashid is being considered for the PAF's highest award for the cadets, the Sword of Honor. Saad becomes enraged at Rashid's success and Sania's happiness for him and lashes out verbally at Rashid after which Sania tells him off in front of everybody, humiliating him.

The scene then jumps to Hamza's parents informing him that they have gotten him engaged to a daughter of his father's close friend, after which he angrily informs them of marriage plans and love for Sania. While his mother is understanding, his father angrily refuses this union on the grounds that he has already promised his friend this marriage proposal and makes Hamza choose between Sania and his wishes. After Hamza chooses Sania, his father disowns him and refuses to speak with him ever again leaving Hamza very saddened. Later a convoy of Pakistani soldiers comes under attack by Taliban militants and gun mounted vehicles during a patrol, and Hamza and Nadir are scrambled to aid the soldiers under attack. Because the attack is happening near heavy civilian areas, Hamza deduces a plan to carry out a dangerous low altitude strike instead of dropping bombs from high a high altitude in order to minimize casualties, thus exposing himself to much anti-aircraft fire. Hamza and Nadir successfully destroy all the Taliban attackers and vehicles, however one militant is able to fire a MANPAD surface to air missile at Hamza's F-16 which sustains heavy damage forcing him to eject. Because of the low altitude, Hamza's parachute doesn't deploy properly and Hamza is critically injured but still continues to fight off militants with his pistol. An army helicopter is able to rescue him and kill the remaining militants and carry Hamza to a hospital but unfortunately his injuries are too severe and he instructs the staff to call Sania for him. After he tells her what happened she is devastated and heart broken but he tells her that since he will be a shaheed he will live forever in spirit and will always be with Sania in whatever she does in her life and that he loves her. He then succumbs to his injuries and embraces martyrdom.

Hamza's father is dismissive of his son's heroics as he believes he purposely chose to carry his mission out with such dangerous tactics because he was a coward and wanted to die instead living and facing the fact that he had shamed his father. But after meeting Sania at his grave she tells him how in that last phone conversation Hamza spoke lovingly about his father and how he wanted to make him proud. Hamza's father then comes to terms with this fact and is remorseful and becomes proud of his martyred son and accepts Sania as a daughter in spirit as well. It is here where it becomes apparent that it wasn't just Sania's patriotism that caused her to become a PAF fighter pilot, but that her whole journey and relationship with Hamza was a big factor as well, and that she wanted to live through him with his dream.

Back in the present a frustrated Saad is pacing about in the gym when he is confronted by Rashid as to why Saad feels anger to him even though Rashid has no ill-feelings towards Saad. Saad cannot contain his anger anymore and knocks down Rashid challenging him to a fight, but he then sees a photo that drops out of Rashid's notebook. It is a picture of a village girl named Sherbatgul, and Saad finds out that she is Rashid's fiancée whom Rashid loves and has every intention of marrying. Saad becomes embarrassed and realizes that he was jealous of Rashid for nothing as he had wrongly feared that Rashid was after Sania. He sincerely apologizes to Rashid and begs for his forgiveness. Rashid then laughs and is amused at the fact that the source of all of Saad's angst and frustration throughout all this time was his hidden love for Sania. During a dinner for the cadets, Rashid teasingly prods to Sania that Saad has something to tell her. Saad begins by apologizing for his behavior and attitude to Sania and when he tries to tell her how he feels about her, Sania becomes embarrassed when she realizes what he is trying to say and tries to act dismissive to him but Saad is left amused and hopeful. At the graduation ceremony all the cadets pass and finally become fighter pilots and Sania receives the award for being the top academic performer, Saad receives the award for best aviator and Rashid as expected receives the Sword of Honor. All the PAF seniors are in attendance along with a promoted and decorated Nadir who is with his wife and his newborn son, who he has named Hamza after his old best friend.

The film then concludes with the same scenes from the beginning showing Sania still coming to the mountainside time to time enjoying several cups of tea by herself, remembering her time with Hamza and coming to full peace of having achieved both his and her dreams. A final scene shows Saad and Sania, now flying the JF-17's, exiting their planes after landing. Sania then sees a vision of Hamza's spirit, smiling at her and then saluting her. Sania and Saad then walking side by side and sharing a laugh and smile, hinting at a possible romance between the two in the future.

Cast
 Hamza Ali Abbasi as Sq/Ldr Hamza Ali Haider
 Hania Amir as Flying officer Sania Taimoor
 Ahad Raza Mir as Flying officer Saad Khan
 Shaz Khan as Sq/Ldr Nadir Kirmani
 Kubra Khan as Fizza Nadir Kirmani  
 Shafaat Ali as Aviation Cadet Zaid Ali
 Sikandar Vincent as Flying officer  Rashid Minhas Yousafzai
 Rachel Viccaji as Flying officer Ujala
 Mustafa Changezi as Flying officer Rashid 
 Sabeena Syed as Diya
 Alamdar Khan as Adil
 Adnan Jaffar as OC Flying Taimoor
 Arslan Asad Butt as Air Force student

Special appearance
 Marina Khan as Sania's mother
 Asif Raza Mir as Haider Ali
 Hina Khawaja Bayat as Shehla
 Annie Zaidi as Sania's aunt
 Farhan Ally Agha as Ali
 Rasheed Naz as waiter
 Shamoon Abbasi
 Irfan Ahmed
 Faisal Nawaz
 Solat Hameed
 Asif Samad
 Jibran
 Shahnawaz Khan
 Ahsen Abdul Sattar
 Israr Shaheed

Production

Development and casting
According to director of media affairs PAF Syed Mohammad Ali and Momina Duraid, the film is intended to be a tribute to Pakistan Air Force with stories inspired from real life. Duraid also announced that all of the major earnings of film will be donated to PAF funds. The casting of Hamza Ali Abbasi and Osman Khalid Butt was announced at the launch event of film, with real life members of Pakistan air force comprising the rest of the cast. Few days later Osman had to withdraw as the film's shoot schedule clashed with his promotions for Balu Mahi and was replaced by Ahad Raza Mir. Farhat Ishtiaq wrote the film's script. The final cast includes Hamza Ali Abbasi, Ahad Raza Mir, Kubra Khan, Hania Aamir, Shaz Khan, Marina Khan and Shamoon Abbasi.

Filming
In an Interview to Daily Pakistan, Hamza Ali Abbasi confirmed that much of the filming was done at various places of Pakistan such as cities which included Saidpur, Murree, Sargodha and Lahore, as well as Karachi. The director Haseeb Hassan also revealed that some parts of the film were shot on K2 and the Karakoram Highway.

Release
Two separate teasers of the film was released, first teaser, featuring Hamza Ali Abbasi and Shaz Khan was released on 19 April 2018, while the second teaser featuring Ahad Raza Mir and Hania Amir was released on 23 April 2018.
The trailer of the film was released on 6 July 2018. Initially, the film was set to release on Eid al-Fitr 2018, but due to the limited screens available, it was postponed until Eid al-Adha 2018. After the delay, the film was released on Eid al-Adha worldwide, 22 August 2018. It had a premiere event in London on same day, after previous premieres were cancelled due to some issues with Central Board of Film Censors. It is the second Pakistani film after Parchi which is screened in Saudi Arabia and the first in China after forty years.

Box office
Parwaaz Hai Junoon opened to a good response on the first day of its release and managed to collect  despite massive clash at the local box office. Film grossed  worldwide,  after four days of its release. Within second week of release, it collected  at local box office, breaking the record of Teefa in Trouble and Punjab Nahi Jaungi of fastest to  locally. After ten days, It collected  at global box office. It collected  locally until the end of 2018. After its release in China in November 2020, the film collected  there lifetime.

Critical response
Shahjehan Saleem of Something Haute rated the film 2.5 stars out of 5 and said, "despite having major problems script-wise, the film is extremely strong in its aesthetics and acting skills". Abdul Waheed Bhutto of Review it rated the film 5 stars out of 5 and said, "The movie is visually appeasing & aesthetically sound with the director also doing complete justice to the beauty of Pakistan".

Omair Alavi rated the film 3 out of 5 stars and wrote to Brandsynario, "It is shot like a TV drama and comes out as one too, despite some very attractive aerial shots where cadets train and pilots unleash their weapons on enemies". Hamza Shafique of Dubai Desi rated the film 3.5 out of 5 stars and wrote, "Overall a very well made, performed and directed product which suffers only from  TV drama serial style screenplay and story telling. The editor of Oye yeah gave a somewhat positive review and praised the direction and marked, " as a film PHJ has little novelty to offer. The recipe has been over been oversold. The changing the sides didn’t much of a difference.It’s a story we have heard before, wanting us to shed tears we have shed before!". Asjad Khan of HIP gave a positive review but criticised the script and praised the performances.

Hamna Zubair of Images Dawn gave a mixed review and wrote "PHJ may leave the audience with renewed respect for the air force but as a viewer, you may only truly enjoy its silly bits, and that's troubling for a film that's not a comedy".

Accolades

Soundtrack

See also
 List of Pakistani films of 2018
 Aircraft in fiction

References

External links
 
 

Hum films
Films directed by Haseeb Hassan
MD Productions
Farhat Ishtiaq
Films with screenplays by Farhat Ishtiaq
Aviation films
Films about air forces
Films shot in Gilgit-Baltistan
Films set in Pakistan
2018 films
Pakistani war films
2010s Urdu-language films